A cigarette is a small roll of finely cut tobacco leaves wrapped in a cylinder of thin paper for smoking.

Cigarette may also refer to:

 "Cigarette", a character of a vivandière in the 1867 novel Under Two Flags
 Cigarette (1/3), a public sculpture located on the Albright Knox Art Gallery grounds
 , a United States Navy patrol vessel in commission from 1917 to 1919
 "Cigarette", a song by Ali Barter on the 2017 album A Suitable Girl
 "Cigarette", a song by Ben Folds Five on the 1997 album Whatever and Ever Amen
 "Cigarette", a song by Frankie Ballard on the 2016 album El Río

Other uses
 Cigarette boat, an alternative name for a go-fast boat

See also
 Cigarettes (disambiguation)